The 2006 West Coast Conference Baseball Championship Series was held on May 26 through 28, 2006 at San Francisco's home stadium, Dante Benedetti Diamond at Max Ulrich Field in San Francisco, California, and pitted the top two finishers from the WCC regular season.

Seeding

Results
Game One

Game Two

Game Three

References

West Coast Conference Baseball Championship
Tournament
Baseball competitions in San Francisco
West Coast Conference Baseball Championship Series
West Coast Conference Baseball Championship Series
College sports tournaments in California